Las Margaritas is a city, and the surrounding municipality of the same name, in the Mexican state of  Chiapas. The municipal seat is located some 25 km to the northeast of Comitán de Domínguez, while the municipality extends to the east as far as the border with Guatemala. Part of the Lagunas de Montebello National Park is in the municipality's territory.

Demographics
As of 2010, the municipality had a total population of 111,484,

As of 2010, the city of Las Margaritas had a population of 20,786. Other than the city of Las Margaritas, the municipality had 486 localities, the largest of which (with 2010 populations in parentheses) were: Plan de Ayala (3,164), classified as urban, and Veinte de Noviembre (2,207), Jalisco (1,915), Yasha (1,862), Chiapas (1,808), Nuevo San Juan Chamula (El Pacayal) (1,684), Bajucú (1,665), Francisco I. Madero (1,626), Justo Sierra (San Francisco) (1,386), El Edén (1,283), Saltillo (1,222), El Vergel (1,177), Rafael Ramírez (1,075), Veracruz (1,062), Lomantán (1,034), and El Progreso (1,007), classified as rural.

History
The municipality was created and the settlement given the status of a pueblo (village) on 9 December 1871, by Governor José Pantaleón Domínguez. On 24 March 1981, under Governor Juan Sabines Gutiérrez, the municipal seat was given city (ciudad) status.

In January 1994 it was one of the cities seized by the Zapatista National Liberation Army (EZLN) during their uprising. The village of La Realidad, headquarters of the EZLN military command, is located in the municipality.

Geography
 
1,521 metres above sea level
Postal code: 30187
LADA area code: 963

Media
XEVFS, a government-run indigenous community radio station.

References

Las Margaritas (Enciclopedia de los municipios de México)

External links
Las Margaritas

Municipalities of Chiapas